Opaeophacus is a monospecific genus belonging to the family Zoarcidae, the eelpouts. Its only species is Opaeophacus acrogeneius which is found in the Bering Sea.

References

Gymnelinae
Monotypic ray-finned fish genera